Pickensville is a rural town in Pickens County, Alabama, United States. At the 2010 census the population was 608, down from 662 in 2000. It was initially incorporated in 1839 (although two other sources claim 1825 and 1835) and briefly served before that as the first county seat of Pickens County. Carrollton was designated as the seat in the early 1830s.

According to the U.S. Census, the incorporation of Pickensville lapsed after 1920. It did not reappear again on the rolls of incorporated towns until 1970.

Geography
Pickensville is located at  (33.230693, -88.272554).

Demographics

2020 census

As of the 2020 United States census, there were 557 people, 309 households, and 198 families residing in the town.

2010 census
As of the 2010 United States Census, there were 608 people living in the town. 63.5% were African American, 36.2% White and 0.3% Native American.

2000 census
As of the census of 2000, there were 662 people, 255 households, and 182 families living in the town. The racial makeup of the town was 35.35% White, 62.99% Black or African American, 0.15% Native American, 0.30% from other races, and 1.21% from two or more races.

There were 255 households, out of which 33.3% had children under the age of 18 living with them, 44.3% were married couples living together, 22.0% had a female householder with no husband present, and 28.6% were non-families. 24.3% of all households were made up of individuals, and 7.5% had someone living alone who was 65 years of age or older. The average household size was 2.60 and the average family size was 3.11.

In the town, the population was spread out, with 27.0% under the age of 18, 10.9% from 18 to 24, 25.5% from 25 to 44, 24.3% from 45 to 64, and 12.2% who were 65 years of age or older. The median age was 36 years. For every 100 females, there were 96.4 males. For every 100 females age 18 and over, there were 93.2 males.

The median income for a household in the town was $25,357, and the median income for a family was $28,036. Males had a median income of $25,625 versus $22,955 for females. The per capita income for the town was $15,575. About 29.2% of families and 34.4% of the population were below the poverty line, including 43.6% of those under age 18 and 53.2% of those age 65 or over.

Arts and culture

Pickensville is home to the Tom Bevill Visitors Center. The Tom Bevill Visitors Center and Museum is a replica of an antebellum plantation mansion built on the Tombigbee River. It houses exhibits on the Tennessee-Tombigbee Waterway and was named for Tom Bevill, a former U.S. Representative from Alabama who chaired the congressional committee that approved funding for the waterway project.  The Montgomery, a 1925 restored snagboat, is located at the museum and operated as a museum ship.

Education
Pickensville was formerly home to a now-defunct female seminary, the Pickensville Female Institute, incorporated in 1848.

Notable people
 Lincoln Clark, member of the Alabama legislature; practiced law in Pickensville between 1931 and 1936
 Harvey Butler Fergusson, lawyer and politician
 Dwayne Ijames, defensive back
 William Belton Murrah, 19th-century Presbyterian minister
 Jacob H. Sharp, Confederate general in the Civil War; born in Pickensville in 1833 but grew up in Mississippi

Gallery
Below are photographs taken in Pickensville in April 1937 as part of the Historic American Buildings Survey (HABS) during the Great Depression:

References

External links
Pickensville Recreation Area

Towns in Pickens County, Alabama
Towns in Alabama